The 1993 German Grand Prix was a Formula One motor race held at Hockenheim on 25 July 1993. It was the tenth race of the 1993 Formula One World Championship.

The 45-lap race was won by Frenchman Alain Prost, driving a Williams-Renault, after he started from pole position. Prost's British teammate Damon Hill led for most of the race, only to be denied his first F1 win by a tyre failure on the penultimate lap. Prost duly took his seventh win of the season, and his 51st and final Grand Prix victory overall, with local driver Michael Schumacher second in a Benetton-Ford and another Briton, Mark Blundell, third in a Ligier-Renault.

Report

The two Williams were 1st and 2nd in qualifying with Prost on pole ahead of Hill, Schumacher, Senna, Blundell and Brundle. Prost had a poor start and was passed by Hill, Schumacher and Senna. Prost reclaimed third from Senna on the run down to the first chicane, which they entered side by side. Exiting the chicane, Senna spun and had to wait for the entire field to pass by before he could rejoin. Fourth placed Brundle then spun as well at the second chicane forcing Prost to take evasive action and bypass part of the track. Both would serve 10-second stop-and-go penalties for this later in the race. At the end of the first lap, Hill led Schumacher, Prost, Blundell, Patrese, Berger and Alesi.

Prost was on a charge, passing Schumacher on lap 6. He closed up on Hill three laps later. Behind, on the next lap, Berger tried to pass Suzuki and they collided, with Suzuki spinning off. Yellow flags were waved and Hill slowed down a little on the next lap. Prost took his chance and passed Hill to lead. He then served his controversial stop-go penalty (which he called a scandal in the press conference later that day) on the next lap and dropped to sixth behind Patrese. 

Schumacher was the first of the leaders to pit for tyres, resuming in fourth place, behind Prost and Blundell and just in front of teammate Patrese. He then passed Blundell for third in the first chicane on the next lap, Brundle having dropped back to midfield due to serving his stop-go penalty on lap 12. Senna had worked his way up to seventh but was unable to pass Berger's Ferrari, eventually choosing to pit for tyres, as did first Patrese and Blundell, leaving the order midway through the race: Hill, Prost, Schumacher, Berger, Blundell, Patrese and Senna, neither Williams choosing to come in for tyres in this race. Blundell on new tyres was able to pass Berger for fourth only for the Austrian to repass him on the next straight with some fierce slipstreaming. Blundell eventually passed Berger for good coming into the stadium section, with Patrese and Senna both closing rapidly on the Austrian. Senna gained fifth place, passing both Patrese and Berger on the following lap, with Patrese also able to slipstream past the Ferrari, which was suffering increasingly on its aging tyres. Schumacher then stopped for a third set of tyres dropping him further behind the two Williams cars while still half a minute clear of Blundell in fourth position, who preserved a slight gap to Senna's McLaren in fifth.

In the closing laps Prost closed on Hill, while Schumacher set a string of fastest lap times to close to within 17s of Prost. Senna - still unable to pass Blundell - came in for an unscheduled tyre stop on lap 41, rejoining safely in front of Patrese. Hill's lead was reduced to 8 seconds by the penultimate lap but appeared to be cruising to victory until, coming out of the Ostkurve, his left rear tyre deflated, Hill having to retire his car before reaching the pits. Instead of Hill taking his first victory, Prost took what was to be his final and 51st win in front of a typically delighted Schumacher followed by Blundell, Senna, Patrese and Berger.

Classification

Qualifying

Race

Championship standings after the race

Drivers' Championship standings

Constructors' Championship standings

References

External links

German Grand Prix
German Grand Prix
Grand Prix
German Grand Prix